Drama City (Deurama Siti, 드라마 시티) is the KBS to broadcast via KBS2TV in a collection of usually single episode short dramas, shown weekly. Each episode is a different story, and the cast changes every week.

1984's "Drama Game" lost its popularity several times since 1997, and the title, broadcast time was moved to late night hours. In 2007 MBC the longevity of a similar nature "Best Theater" that aired after stopping South Korea's broadcasting "HDTV's Literature" by abolishing in 2007 from the current terrestrial broadcasting was the only remaining act play series. And the type of material to test an experimental stage, but it was a classic in terms of audience and advertising revenue.

Due to operating losses in spring 2008 it was decided to abolish the target program. The director and writers, such as the abolition of all walks of life, but opposition to the decision, March 29, 2008. Previously, for the purpose of drama airing time two Bukkaji City and was made the first four episodes of "TV City will live to regret for the things knowingly committing" a "special theme drama" in the name of June 8, 2008, 9, 16 days, 9 15 (Chuseok holidays) are shown in episodes 1, 2009 Angkor was televised on New Year's holiday period.

Republic of Korea in the broadcast program for viewing on a television show age rating system in 2002 as the first test conducted  was also applied.

Episodes

2004

2005

2006

2007

See also
Drama Special
Drama Special Series
Drama City: What Should I Do?
Pianist (TV special)

References

External links
Drama City Official Website
Drama City Homepage (since 2002)
Sunday Best Homepage (until 2002)
Episodes listing (since 2002)
Episodes listing (1999-2001)
Episodes listing (1997-1998)
Korean Wiz

Korean Broadcasting System television dramas
1984 South Korean television series debuts
2008 South Korean television series endings